The Class ვმკ (VMK) is an EMU (Electric multiple unit) by CSR Corporation Limited with the top speed of 130 km/h, operated by Georgian Railways under 3 kV DC overhead wires on cross-country routes.

Gallery

References

Rail transport in Georgia (country)

3000 V DC multiple units
CRRC multiple units